Mainstockheim is a municipality in the district of Kitzingen in Bavaria in Germany. It is famous for its choir, the Choir of Mainstockheim.

Notable people
 Marie J. Mergler (1851–1901), physician

References

Kitzingen (district)